Iranian Kazakhs live mainly in the Golestān Province in Northern Iran. According to ethnologue.org, however, there were 3000 Kazakhs living in Iran in 1982 in the city of Gorgan. The number of Iranian Kazakhs might have been slightly higher, because many of them returned to Kazakhstan after the dissolution of the Soviet Union, from where they had immigrated to Iran after the Bolshevik October Revolution (1917).

Currently, the city of Gorgan contains 5000 ethnic Kazakhs, who speak Kazakh and Persian on varying levels.

Origins
The first Kazakhs arrived from the territory of Turkmenistan into the northeastern city of Gorgan in 1929. Since then, Kazakh immigration has experienced three distinct waves. The first occurred with the creation of the Kazakh Soviet Socialist Republic. The second wave occurred with the fall of the Soviet Union, which saw the population of Kazakh Iranians swell significantly. Unlike the previous wave of immigration, these individuals were acculturated with the Russian language, rather than Kazakh. The final wave has been ongoing since 2007 and consists of economic migrants arriving from the western provinces of Atyrau and Mangystau to the cities of Gorgan, Bandar Torkaman and Gonbad-e Qabus.

See also
 Iranian Turks
 Kazakhs

References

Kazakhs
Iran–Soviet Union relations
Expatriates in Iran
Ethnic Kazakh people
Kazakhstani diaspora
Iran–Kazakhstan relations